David Somers (born September 1948) is a chartered accountant and Pension Fund manager. From 2013 to 2015 he was the Chairman of Rangers Football Club.

Career 
Somers is a chartered accountant and is a non-executive director of ACE Europe life which is part of the ACE Group of insurance and reinsurance companies. Somers was also a non-Executive Director and Chairman of Audit & Risk Committee of Europe Arab Bank, he is the Independent Trustee & Chairman of the Investment Sub Committee at Fujitsu Technologies International Pension Plan and the Chairman of the Investment Committee at TCF Investment Managers Ltd.

Somers is the former chairman of Rangers Football Club. His appointment was announce on 7 November 2013 and it was ratified at the clubs AGM on 19 December 2013. Somers left the board on 2 March 2015, prior to Dave King's takeover.

References

Living people
1948 births
Chairmen and investors of football clubs in Scotland
Rangers F.C. chairmen
People from Scarborough, North Yorkshire